Ceratophyllus qinghaiensis is a species of flea in the family Ceratophyllidae. It was described by Guangdeng and Liming in 1985.

References 

Ceratophyllidae
Insects described in 1985